The Khappers were employed by the Kahals to fulfill the recruit quotas imposed on the Jewish communities from 1827 to 1857 in the Russian Empire.

The Khappers were employed to kidnap Jewish boys (sometimes as young as eight) to fill out a quota of Jews required to enter the cantonist schools, in preparation for service in the Russian Army, in the situations where such quotas were not filled legally, due to attempts by the families to hide their children. The term is a 19th-century colloquialism that comes from the Yiddish word for grabber.

See also
 Cantonist

Jews and Judaism in the Russian Empire
Obsolete occupations